William Clifton (1891–1953) was an English footballer who played for Preston North End and Rochdale.

References

Rochdale A.F.C. players
Preston North End F.C. players
People from Leyland, Lancashire
1891 births
1953 deaths
English footballers
Association football wingers